Ginásio de Esportes Geraldo Magalhães, also known as the Geraldão, is an indoor sporting arena located in Recife, Brazil.  The capacity of the arena is 15,000 spectators and opened in 1970.  It hosts indoor sporting events such as basketball and volleyball, and also hosts concerts.

External links
Arena information

Indoor arenas in Brazil
Sports venues in Recife